Tung Wah Group of Hospitals Museum is a museum housed in the former Main Hall Building of Kwong Wah Hospital, located at 25 Waterloo Road, Kowloon, Hong Kong. Only this building was preserved when Kwong Wah Hospital was re-developed in 1958–1963. This building was built in 1911; it was classified as a Grade I historic building and in 2010, it was declared as a monument in 2010.

Display
The Museum was set up in 1970, the centenary year of Tung Wah Group of Hospitals. It displays the archives and relics of the Tung Wah Group of Hospitals. The exhibits include the plaque presented by Li Hongzhang, a Qing official, with three of his colleagues in 1884. There are other plaques and gifts presented to the Hospitals by officials from Qing Dynasty and the Republic of China

Hours
The Museum is open from Monday through Saturday: 10 a.m. to 6 p.m. and is closed on public holidays.

Transportation
Yau Ma Tei station Exit A2

References

External links

 Tung Wah Museum at Antiquities and Monuments Office website
 Hospital Authority: History of Kwong Wah Hospital

Medical museums in Hong Kong
Tung Wah Group of Hospitals
Yau Ma Tei
Declared monuments of Hong Kong
Hospital museums